The T-Mobile Pulse (Huawei U8220)(sold as the CHT8000 in Taiwan) is an Android-powered phone manufactured by Huawei and rebranded by T-Mobile. It is available in many markets including the UK and The Netherlands. Compared to many Android phones released at the time it was relatively low cost - originally selling for £185 in the UK, the Pulse achieved a minimum price of £19.99 + £10 top up on PAYG before being discontinued in April 2011. This made it one of the cheapest Android powered smartphones available at the time. The Pulse was also marketed as being the first Pay As You Go phone running the Android OS.

Technical specifications 

 Operating system Android, officially 2.1, can be upgraded to custom 2.2 ROMS
 Power 4.2 V 1150 mAh (4.3 Wh) Internal rechargeable removable lithium-ion battery
 CPU 768 MHz ARMv6-capable processor, Underclocked to 528 MHz
 Storage capacity Flash memory: 256MB with microSD slot supporting up to 16 GB
 Memory 192 MB DDR SDRAM (Some models have 256 MB)
 Display 320 x 480 px, 3.5 in (89 mm), HVGA, transflective TFT
 Input "Capacitive" touchscreen display without multi-touch feature, on-screen QWERTY keyboard, volume controls, 3-axis accelerometer, 4 front-facing physical buttons
 Camera 3.2 megapixel CMOS Sensor with auto focus (Rear-Facing Camera).
 Sensors A-GPS, 3-axis Accelerometer, Magnetometer (Compass), Battery Temperature Sensor
 Connectivity WCDMA (3G) or GSM (2G) telephony network, Wi-Fi (802.11b/g), Bluetooth 2.0+EDR, Micro USB, A-GPS
 Dimensions 116 mm (4.6 in) (h); 62.5 mm (2.46 in) (w); 13.6 mm (0.54 in) (d)
 Weight 135 g (4.8 oz)

Firmware / ROMs
The Pulse was originally released with Android 1.5 heavily customized and branded by T-Mobile. It came with its own Home screen app, as well as various non-stock applications, including Documents To Go and RoadSync from DataViz.

Official firmware
Official firmware from the manufacturer, have been independently released by
 T-Mobile Hungary
 T-Mobile Sweden
 T-Mobile UK

As of June 2010, T-Mobile has provided some firmware releases for the Pulse:
 November 2009 Open Source Code released
 November 2009 Pulse firmware download
 December 2009 Increased stability; Improved audio
 May 2010 2.1 available in Hungary as an update
 August 2010 2.1 available in the UK as an update (T-Mobile has since removed this update from their site for further bug testing due to a SMS issue.)
 September 2010 2.1 Source Code released
 February 2011 2.1 available in the UK as an update (...B836... compared to ...B826... in Aug 2010, including the SMS fix)

Unofficial firmware
It is possible to root the Pulse, using software developed by the Android community. A custom recovery image is also installable.

Several custom ROMs have been created adding various features, including EXT2/3/4 file system support and Busybox pre-installation.
The firmware from the Huawei u8230 has been ported to the Pulse to remove the T-Mobile branding, as well as other changes.

On 12 May, 2.1 was released on the Modaco Forums.

On 8 October, Tom G from the Modaco Forums ported a 2.2 beta of CyanogenMod 6. Latest available version is CM6.1RC2 0.40 Beta.

The highest supported CyanogenMod version is 7; it is based on Android 2.3.7.

See also
List of Android devices

References

External links 
 Huawei U8220 product page on Huawei Device website
 Huawei U8220 wiki page at Modaco Wiki

Android (operating system) devices
Smartphones
Mobile phones introduced in 2009
Huawei mobile phones
Discontinued smartphones